Shadia Simmons (born June 28, 1986) is a Canadian former actress, teacher, and director. She is best known for her role as Corrine Baxter in the television series Strange Days at Blake Holsey High, her recurring role as Emily on Life with Derek and for her starring role as Piper Dellums in the 2000 movie The Color of Friendship.

Career
Her first film was Moonlight and Valentino, where she played the part of Jenny Morrow, the daughter of a character played by Whoopi Goldberg. She appeared in the Disney production A Saintly Switch and was cast in a number of Disney Channel Original Movies. Simmons has starred in four television series, Ace Lightning, I Was a Sixth Grade Alien, Life with Derek, and Strange Days at Blake Holsey High.

Personal life
Simmons was born in Toronto, Ontario.  She has completed her Master's degree in Education at a college in Buffalo, New York. Shadia is the oldest out of three siblings; she has a brother named A.J. and a sister named Sabrina. She also has three children, two daughters and a son.

Teaching career
With her New York and Ontario teaching certification, she is now teaching at the High School level. Shadia is also a director at Star Acting Studios.

Filmography

References

External links 
 
 Star Acting Studios

1986 births
Living people
20th-century Canadian actresses
21st-century Canadian actresses
Actresses from Toronto
Black Canadian actresses
Canadian child actresses
Canadian film actresses
Canadian television actresses
Canadian people of Nigerian descent